Qillqa (Quechua for writing (the act and art of writing) Hispanicized spelling Quillca) is a  mountain in the La Raya mountain range in the Andes of Peru. It is located in the Cusco Region, Canchis Province, Marangani District.

Southwest of the mountain there is also a lake named Qillqa with an intermittent stream of the same name. The stream is a right affluent of the Willkanuta River.

References

Mountains of Peru
Mountains of Cusco Region